Temnaoré may refer to:

 Temnaoré, Bam, Burkina Faso
 Temnaoré, Boulkiemdé, Burkina Faso